Frida Rosell (born 6 May 1999) is a Swedish handball player for IK Sävehof and the Swedish national team.

She made her debut on the Swedish national team on 1 October 2020, against Poland.

On 20 January 2023, it was announced that she had signed a two-year contract with ESBF Besançon in France.

Achievements 
Svensk handbollselit:
Winner: 2022
Runner-up: 2021

References

External links

1999 births
Living people
Swedish female handball players
Expatriate handball players
Swedish expatriate sportspeople in France
Swedish expatriate sportspeople in Norway